Ritual is the eleventh album by American heavy metal band Soulfly, released on October 19, 2018, through Nuclear Blast. It is the third Soulfly album with Max Cavalera's son Zyon behind the drum kit, and the last album to feature lead guitarist Marc Rizzo, and features musical guests Randy Blythe of Lamb of God, Ross Dolan of Immolation, and Mark Damon of The Pretty Reckless. Four singles were released from the album—"Evil Empowered", title track "Ritual", "Dead Behind the Eyes", and "Under Rapture".

The album was produced by Josh Wilbur. Max Cavalera published the statement and said "For this one, we really tried to retain the groove of early Soulfly as well as my love for the heavy, fast stuff I'm into: like death and black metal and some hardcore. Working with Josh Wilbur for Soulfly this time around has been amazing. He's a huge fan and added a lot to the record. I would fight for the fast songs and he would always push me to add more groove. I think in the end we created a really cool mix of songs that covers a lot of ground in my career."

Ritual sold 3,600 copies in its first week of release in the US
and is the first Soulfly album to not debut on the Billboard 200.

Reception 
Ritual received generally favorable reviews by critics, with the aggregate score of 75% on Metacritic. Prior to release, Wall of Sound writer Jim Birkin rated the album 9/10, stating: "There is undoubtedly some old school Cavalera creeping into his music these days and that can only be a good thing. May all future Soulfly albums contain Josh Wilbur in its production." This album was awarded a 2018 Metal Storm Award for Best Thrash Metal Album.

Track listing

Personnel 

Soulfly
 Max Cavalera – vocals, rhythm guitar, sitar on "Soulfly XI"
 Marc Rizzo – lead guitar, flamenco guitar on "Soulfly XI"
 Zyon Cavalera – drums, percussion
 Mike Leon – bass

Additional musicians
 Nick Rowe – programming
 Gary Elthie – drum and vocals on "Ritual", flute on "Blood on the Street"
 Travis Stone – additional vocals on "Ritual"
 D. Randall Blythe – additional vocals on "Dead Behind the Eyes"
 Elizabeth Mictian – daf on "Dead Behind the Eyes"
 Ross Dolan – additional vocals on "Under Rapture"
 Josh Lomatewaima – drum and vocals on "Blood on the Street"
 Chase Numkena – drum and vocals on "Blood on the Street"
 Ron Taho – drum and vocals on "Blood on the Street"
 Igor A. Cavalera – additional vocals on "Feedback!"
 Mark Damon – saxophone on "Soulfly XI"

Production
 Josh Wilbur – engineering, recording, mixing, production
 Nick Rowe – engineering
 Josh Brooks – engineering
 Brad Blackwood – mastering
 Lana Migliore – assistant engineering
 Jeff Sinclair – assistant engineering
 Kyle McAulay – assistant engineering

Artwork
 Eliran Kantor – cover illustration
 Leo Zulueta – band logo
 Glen La Ferman – photography
 Marcelo Vasco – package design, inner illustration

Charts

References

2018 albums
Soulfly albums
Nuclear Blast albums
Albums with cover art by Eliran Kantor